The Vietnam National Museum of History  is in the Hoan Kiem district of Hanoi, Vietnam. The museum building was an archaeological research institution of the French School of the Far East under French colonial rule (Louis Finot École française d'Extrême-Orient EFEO) of 1910, was extensively refurbished in 1920. It was redesigned between 1926 and 1932 by architect Ernest Hébrard. The museum was acquired by the government of North Vietnam (now the government of Vietnam) in 1958 and then the artifact collections were expanded to cover eastern arts and national history.

The museum highlights Vietnam's prehistory (about 300,000–400,000 years ago) up to the August 1945 Revolution. It has over 200,000 exhibits displayed covering items from prehistory up to the 1947 revolution and founding of the Democratic Republic of Vietnam, arranged in five major sections.

Location
The museum is at the back of the Hanoi Opera House. It is on 1 Trang Tien Street, 216 Tran Quang Khai Street, Hanoi.

History 
The museum building used to be the archaeological research institution of the French School of the Far East under French colonial rule (Louis Finot École française d'Extrême-Orient EFEO), which opened in 1910. This was extensively refurbished in 1920, and redesigned between 1926 and 1932 by the architect Ernest Hébrard. It is considered a  blend of French colonial and traditional Vietnamese architecture, also called Indochina architecture. The museum was acquired by the government of North Vietnam in 1958 and then the artifact collections were expanded to cover eastern arts and national history. It was formally opened for public viewing on 3 September 1958. The museum's exhibits highlight  Vietnam's prehistory (about 300,000–400,000 years ago) up to the August 1945 Revolution.

Features
The museum is housed in a colonial French building which is a cupola shaped edifice in the shape of a pagoda. The design of the building is an amalgamation of French and Chinese architecture known as Indochina architecture. The building designed by Hebrard, incorporates double walls and balconies for a natural ventilation system and protection from sunshine. It is divided into five major sections: Section 1 covers period from the prehistoric period from the Stone Age (30,000–40,000 years ) to 4,000–5,000 years ago; Section 2 has displays from the time of nation building during the Tran dynasty; Section 3 has exhibits from the period of the Ho dynasty to the August 1945 Revolution; and Section 4 has artifacts of the Champa stone sculptures. The museum showcases Vietnam's history with very large collection of about 200,000 items, covering the Neolothic age, Bronze Age, Sa Hunh, Oc Eo, and Hung periods, Nguyen dynasty, Cham period, and also northern Vietnam's Dong Son, a culture which existed about 1000 BC-100 AD. These exhibits are in the main building. The exhibits highlight communism and depict the rule of the French colonists as cruel.

Exhibits

Exhibits in the museum include Hung era and Neolithic mortuaries, Bronze Age implements such as axe heads, and Cham period artifacts. There is an intimidating sculpture of Quan Am, the Goddess of Mercy, which has 1,000 eyes and arms. Also on display are the 13 Nguyễn dynasty emperor's ornamented throne, dresses and other antiquities. These include the large Dong Son drums, which are symbolic of Vietnamese culture. At ground level the display consist of stone implements, pottery, and ornaments, up to 1400 AD. On the first floor the exhibits pertain to the monarchic reign from the time of the Dinh and Le eras of 900 ADs to Vietnam's last emperors; these are decorative items such as a chest of drawers inlaid with mother-of-pearl, cylindrical containers of enamel (these are funerary jars), ceramics and bright lacquer ware. There is a stele which was found during an archaeological excavation with an inscription at a monument labeled G1, which is dedicated to God Harivamsesvara by Harivarman I (ca. 1137) is preserved in the museum. The exhibits of new artifacts cover Central Vietnam, Central Highlands, South Vietnam and also an old shipwreck near Cu Lao Cham Island. The museum has signage in English, but this is inadequate to express all that is on display in the museum.

To popularize Vietnam's history from the past to the present, the Museum administration organized an exhibition of 450 artifacts (416 from 13 Vietnamese museums and the balance from 8 European museums) in Austria and Belgium from September 2003 to November 2004. The Royal Museum of Arts and History (Kingdom of Belgium) and the Vienna Ethnology Museum (Republic of Austria) were associated with this exhibition, which was titled "Vietnam – Past and Present."

References

Bibliography

External links 

 Official Website English language section
 Frommer's | National Museum of Vietnamese History

Museums in Hanoi
History museums in Vietnam
French colonial architecture in Vietnam